Lələkəran (also, Lyalyageran and Lyalyakeran) is a village in the Lerik Rayon of Azerbaijan.  The village forms part of the municipality of Qosmalyan.

References 

Populated places in Lerik District